El Alma al Aire (The Soul to Air) is the sixth studio album recorded by Spanish singer-songwriter Alejandro Sanz, It was released by WEA Latina on September 26, 2000 (see 2000 in music). It is one of his more suggestive and emotive works. It beat all the records of sale of the Spanish market on having reached the 1,000,000 copies in the first week.

Track listing
 Cuando Nadie Me Ve – 5:07
 Hay Un Universo de Pequeñas Cosas – 5:22
 Quisiera Ser – 5:30
 Para Que Me Quieras – 4:29
 Llega, Llegó Soledad – 4:38
 El Alma al Aire – 5:58
 Me Iré – 5:40
 Hicimos Un Trato – 4:37
 Tiene Que Ser Pecado – 5:05
 Silencio – 4:37 (6:35–8:22 – hidden track: Desde mis Centros)

Chart performance

Album

Singles

Sales and certifications

Personnel

 Vicente Amigo – Spanish guitar in "Quisiera Ser" and "El Alma al Aire"
 Gennady Aronin – Violin
 Enrique Badulescu – Photography
 Antonio Baglio – Mastering
 Tim Barnes – Viola
 Maurizio Biancani – Mixing
 Renato Cantele – Engineer, mixing
 Huifang Chen – Violin
 Janet Clippard – Bass
 Gustavo Correa – Violin
 Montse Cortés – Background vocals in "Quisiera Ser" and "El Alma al Aire"
 John DiPuccio – Violin
 Paquito Echevarría – Piano tumbao in "El Alma al Aire"
 Joan Faigen – Violin
 Scott Flavin – Violin
 Chris Glansdorp – Cello
 Alfredo Golino – Drums
 Jorge González – Assistant engineer
 Luca Jurman – Arranger, background vocals
 Mei Mei Luo – Violin
 Roberto Maccagno – Engineer, technical coordinator

 Charo Manzano – Background vocals in "Quisiera Ser" and "El Alma al Aire"
 Raul Midón – Background vocals
 José Antonio Molina – Arranger, orchestra director
 Susan Moyer – Cello
 Alfredo Oliva – Violin
 Alfredo Paixao – Bass, background vocals
 Wendy Pedersen – Background vocals
 Lulo Pérez – Arranger, trumpet
 Dave Poler – Assistant engineer
 Rita Quintero – Background vocals
 Keith Robinson – Cello
 Emanuele Ruffinengo – Arranger, concept, record producer
 Alejandro Sanz – Vocals, background vocals, arranger, concept
 Rafa Sañudo – Art direction, design
 Debra Spring – Viola
 Ramiro Terán – Background vocals
 Christine Tramontano – Assistant engineer
 Ludovico Vagnone – Acoustic guitar, electric guitar
 Bruce Wethey – Violin
 Bogumila Zgraja – Violin

Awards

Special edition

El Alma al Aire: Edición Especial is the 2001 re-release of the album El Alma al Aire containing 2 CDs. The CD 1 is the same as the original album and the CD 2 contains 5 new tracks (his duets with the Irish group The Corrs, a duet with the Mexican singer Armando Manzanero and a remix of the song "Tiene Que Ser Pecado").

Track listing

CD 1
 Cuando Nadie Me Ve – 5:07
 Hay un Universo de Pequeñas Cosas – 5:22
 Quisiera Ser – 5:30
 Para Que Me Quieras – 4:29
 Llega, Llegó Soledad – 4:37
 El Alma al Aire – 5:58
 Me Iré – 5:40
 Hicimos un Trato – 4:37
 Tiene Que Ser Pecado – 5:05
 Silencio – 8:22 (contains the hidden track "Desde mis centros")

CD 2
 11 Me Iré (The Hardest Day) con The Corrs – 4:26
 12 Una Noche con The Corrs – 4:44
 13 Adoro con Armando Manzanero – 4:17
 14 Tiene Que Ser Pecado (alternative mix) – 5:22
 15 The Hardest Day con The Corrs – 4:38

Re-release

El Alma al Aire (Edición 2006) is the 2006 re-release of the album El Alma al Aire containing a CD and DVD. The CD contains 13 tracks and the DVD contains 14 videos.

Track listing

CD
 Cuando Nadie Me Ve – 5:07
 Hay un Universo de Pequeñas Cosas – 5:22
 Quisiera Ser – 5:30
 Para Que Me Quieras – 4:29
 Llega, Llegó Soledad – 4:37
 El Alma al Aire – 5:58
 Me Iré – 5:40
 Hicimos un Trato – 4:37
 Tiene Que Ser Pecado – 5:05
 Silencio – 8:22 (contains the hidden track "Desde Mis Centros")
 Cuando Nadie Me Ve (demo) – 5:01
 El Alma al Aire (demo) – 5:39
 Una Noche con The Corrs – 8:12

DVD
 Cuando Nadie Me Ve (Video)
 Quisiera Ser (Video)
 El Alma al Aire (Video)
 Llega, Llegó Soledad (Video)
 Una Noche con The Corrs (Video)
 The Hardest Day con The Corrs (Video)
 Tiene Que Ser Pecado (2001 Concert at Vicente Calderón Stadium)
 Llega, Llegó Soledad (2001 Concert at Vicente Calderón Stadium)
 Cuando Nadie Me Ve (2001 Concert at Vicente Calderón Stadium)
 Me Iré (2001 Concert at Vicente Calderón Stadium)
 Hay un Universo de Pequeñas Cosas (2001 Concert at Vicente Calderón Stadium)
 El Alma al Aire (2001 Concert at Vicente Calderón Stadium)
 Quisiera Ser (2001 Concert at Vicente Calderón Stadium)
 EPK

See also
List of best-selling albums in Spain
 List of best-selling Latin albums

References

2000 albums
Alejandro Sanz albums
Latin Grammy Award winners for Album of the Year
Warner Music Latina albums
Latin Grammy Award for Best Male Pop Vocal Album